Butternut Hill, also known as Prospect Hill, Blake House, and Ross House, is a historic home located at Terre Haute, Vigo County, Indiana. It was built about 1835, and enlarged in 1869 and 1902. It is a two-story, central passage plan, vernacular Greek Revival style brick dwelling.

It was listed on the National Register of Historic Places in 1993.

References

Houses on the National Register of Historic Places in Indiana
Greek Revival houses in Indiana
Houses completed in 1835
Buildings and structures in Terre Haute, Indiana
National Register of Historic Places in Terre Haute, Indiana